Kalnieši Parish is an administrative unit of Krāslava Municipality, Latvia.

Towns, villages and settlements of Kalnieši parish 
 Kalnieši
 Andžāni

External links

Parishes of Latvia
Krāslava Municipality